WTYS-FM (94.1 FM) is a radio station broadcasting a Southern gospel format. WTYS-FM is licensed to serve the community of Marianna, Florida, United States.  The station is currently owned by James L. Adams, Jr.

History
The station was assigned the call letters WSEJ on 1991-07-26.  On 1996-05-22, the station changed its call sign to WBNF then on 1999-09-13 changed to the current WTYS.

References

External links

Gospel radio stations in the United States
Radio stations established in 1991
1991 establishments in Florida
Southern Gospel radio stations in the United States
TYS-FM